Altmärkische Höhe (literally "Altmarkian Height") is a municipality in the district of Stendal, in Saxony-Anhalt, Germany.

It was formed on 1 January 2010 by the merger of the former municipalities Boock, Bretsch, Gagel, Heiligenfelde, Kossebau, Losse and Lückstedt.

References

 
Stendal (district)